Green Lantern: Original Motion Picture Soundtrack is a soundtrack to the film of the same name, and it was released in stores on June 14, 2011. The soundtrack was composed by James Newton Howard, who also worked on the other Warner Bros/DC Comics based films Batman Begins and The Dark Knight with Hans Zimmer. The soundtrack was published by WaterTower Music.

Track listing

Instrumentation
 Strings: 43 violins, 24 violas, 19 violoncellos, 14 double basses
 Woodwinds: 2 flutes, 3 oboes, 2 clarinets, 2 bassoons
 Brass: 11 French horns, 5 trumpets, 10 trombones, 2 tubas
 Percussion: 5 players
 2 harps, 2 guitars, 1 piano

Performed by The Hollywood Studio Symphony. Conducted by Pete Anthony. Choir: The London Voices.

References

External links
 Soundtracks for Green Lantern at the Internet Movie Database

2011 soundtrack albums
Superhero film soundtracks
Green Lantern in other media
DC Comics film soundtracks
WaterTower Music soundtracks